Phinehas is an American metalcore band formed in Los Angeles, California, in 2001. The group consists of vocalist Sean McCulloch, guitarist Daniel Gailey, bassist Bryce Kelley and drummer Isaiah Perez. They are currently signed to Solid State Records and have released five studio albums. Their most recent studio album, The Fire Itself, was released on August 27, 2021.

History

Formation, line-up changes and Thegodmachine (2001–2012)
Phinehas formed in 2001 in Los Angeles, California. The band went through a few line-up changes before settling on Sean McCulloch (vocals), Jason Combs (guitars), Ryan Estrada (bass) and Lee Humerian (drums). The band recorded and independently released a self-titled EP on December 15, 2009. After the release, the band went on a 10-day tour before beginning work on their debut album Thegodmachine.

After finishing production of the album, the band looked at many labels, before being signed to Red Cord Records in 2011. Thegodmachine was released on September 30, 2011, through Red Cord, and received acclaim from music critics. Most of the praise came from the band's "uncompromising blast of metalcore" and the thrash metal-style riffs. The band toured extensively to promote the album, including a spot at Cornerstone Festival in 2011, with bands such as P.O.D., For Today, Close Your Eyes and Living Sacrifice among others.

The Last Word Is Yours to Speak (2013–2014)
In early 2013, their second EP, The Bridge Between, was released featuring updated versions of songs from their self-titled EP and acoustic renditions of songs from Thegodmachine. Shortly after the release of The Bridge Between, Phinehas began work on their second studio album. On May 17, the first single, "Fleshkiller", was released along with the album's title, The Last Word Is Yours to Speak.

The band's second studio album, The Last Word Is Yours to Speak, was released on July 23, 2013, through Red Cord Records. The album proved to be successful as it gained the band their first charting positions on Billboard, charting on the Top Heatseekers chart and the Top Christian Albums chart. The album features guest vocals from Brennan Chaulk of the band Haste the Day. It has also a slight change in sound, with Sean McCulloch's vocals being more clean and less gruff. Also, the album features a strong influence from Southern rock, similar to their self-titled EP.

After the production of the release, Phinehas toured in support of the album. The band was featured on the "March Make a Mess Tour!" with headliner Close to Home. This tour included stops at South by Southwest and South by So What?!. Guitarist Jason Combs left the band in 2014, being replaced by Daniel Gailey of Becoming the Archetype.

Till the End (2014–2016)
At the end of 2014, Phinehas announced they would begin working on their third studio album after concluding their tour for The Last Word Is Yours to Speak. On February 17, 2015, the band announced they had signed to Artery Recordings after their previous label, Red Cord Records, dissolved into Victory Records. On May 4, Phinehas released the first single "Dead Choir" and announced that their third studio album, Till the End, would be released on July 10, 2015. On June 9, the band released the live music video for the song "Tetelestai". On July 13, three days after the album's release, the band unveiled a music video for the third single, "White Livered".

Dark Flag (2016–2019)
On December 16, 2016, the band released their third EP, titled Fight Through the Night featuring guest vocals from Garrett Russell of Silent Planet. On January 10, 2017, drummer Lee Humerian announced his departure from the band and performed his last show on January 21. Phinehas supported Erra on tour in the Spring of 2017. On September 13, the band signed to Solid State Records. On September 22, the band announced their fourth studio album titled Dark Flag would be released on November 17, 2017. Along with the announcement, they also released the album's title track.

Drums for the album were recorded by their former drummer, Lee Humerian, according to the band. On April 18, 2018, Phinehas announced that the session drummer of their past tour, Isaiah Perez, would be taking over the formerly vacant drums permanently. The band supported Within the Ruins in the Summer of 2018 alongside Great American Ghost and Sentinels while also supported As I Lay Dying on tour in the Spring of 2019. They then embarked on a small tour in the Summer of 2019.

The Fire Itself (2020–present)
On August 1, 2020, Phinehas announced that it had begun writing for its fifth studio album, expecting to release it in 2021. On March 27, 2021, the band posted a photo on its official Facebook page, announcing that production of the album had begun. On July 8, Phinehas released a brand new single "In the Night" and announced that their upcoming fifth studio album, The Fire Itself, is set for release on August 27, 2021. At the same time, the band revealed the album cover and the track list. On July 29, they debuted the second single "Eternally Apart". On August 20, one week before the album release, the band unveiled the third single and title track "The Fire Itself".

Musical style
Phinehas have primarily been classified as metalcore, a mixture of hardcore punk and extreme metal. They have also been considered to incorporate elements of Christian metal and Southern rock into their style, and to be especially influenced by thrash metal.

Members

Current
 Sean McCulloch – lead vocals (2007–present); rhythm guitar (2011–2012); drums (2017–2018)
 Bryce Kelley – bass, backing vocals (2012–present)
 Daniel Gailey – guitars, backing vocals (2014–present)
 Isaiah Perez – drums (2018–present; touring member 2017)

Former
 Phil Killpatrick – rhythm guitar (2001–2005)
 Michael Angelo Ruffino – rhythm guitar (2001–2007)
 Michael Kevin Killpatrick – drums, rhythm guitar (2001–2007)
 Matt Yriarte – lead vocals (2003–2007)
 Glenn Gizzi – lead guitar, backing vocals (2001–2010)
 Scott Whelan – rhythm guitar, backing vocals (2006–2011)
 Ryan Estrada – bass (2006–2012)
 Dustin Saunders – rhythm guitar (2011–2012)
 Jason Combs – lead guitar (2010–2014); rhythm guitar (2012–2014)
 Lee Humerian – drums, backing vocals (2007–2017); rhythm guitar (2011–2012)

Session and touring musicians
 Chris Deets – drums (2013, 2014)

Timeline

Discography

Studio albums

Extended plays

Singles

Music videos

References

2001 establishments in California
Metalcore musical groups from California
American Christian metal musical groups
Musical groups established in 2001
Musical groups from California
Musical quartets
People from La Mirada, California